Albert Oakland Park is an  park in Columbia, Missouri, in the United States. The park is located at 1900 Blue Ridge Road next to Oakland Junior High School.

History

The southern  of the park was donated to the City of Columbia in 1964 and is known as the C.M. Albert Memorial Park.

Activities in the park

Facilities

 Albert-Oakland Family Aquatic Center 
 Reservable Shelters - three total with drinking fountains, power outlets, BBQ grills, and restroom access.

Sports

 Baseball/Softball fields - two
 Basketball court - one
 Disc Golf course - two 
 Playgrounds - two
 Soccer fields - two
 Tennis courts - three
 Sand Volleyball courts - two

Trails

Several trails wind through the park:
 
 Bear Creek Trail - (4.8 miles).  This limestone gravel trail runs along Bear Creek and connects the park to the  Columbia Cosmopolitan Recreation Area.
 Fitness Trail - (1 Mile).  A hard surface trail with eighteen exercise stations.

References
 Albert Oakland Park official site

Parks in Missouri
Parks in Columbia, Missouri
Protected areas of Boone County, Missouri
Tourist attractions in Columbia, Missouri